The 2021 Northwestern State Demons baseball team represented Northwestern State University during the 2021 NCAA Division I baseball season. The Demons played their home games at H. Alvin Brown–C. C. Stroud Field and were led by fifth–year head coach Bobby Barbier. They were members of the Southland Conference.

Preseason

Southland Conference Coaches Poll
The Southland Conference Coaches Poll was released on February 11, 2021 and the Demons were picked to finish fifth in the conference with 193 votes.

Preseason All-Southland Team & Honors

First Team
Ryan Flores (UIW, 1st Base)
Nate Fisbeck (MCNS, 2nd Base)
Beau Orlando (UCA, 3rd Base)
JC Correa (LAMR, Shortstop)
Gavin Johnson (SHSU, Catcher)
Clayton Rasbeary (MCNS, Designated Hitter)
Sean Arnold (UIW, Outfielder)
Brandon Bena (HBU, Outfielder)
Colton Cowser (SHSU, Outfielder)
Noah Cameron (UCA, Pitcher)
Will Dion (MCNS, Pitcher)
Kyle Gruller (HBU, Pitcher)
Conner Williams (UCA, Pitcher)
Itchy Burts (TAMUCC, Utility)

Second Team
Preston Faulkner (SELA, 1st Base)
Logan Berlof (LAMR, 2nd Base)
Anthony Quirion (LAMR, 3rd Base)
Reid Bourque (MCNS, Shortstop)
Chris Sandberg (NICH, Catcher)
Lee Thomas (UIW, Designated Hitter)
Josh Ragan (UCA, Outfielder)
Jack Rogers (SHSU, Outfielder)
Tyler Smith (NSU, Outfielder)
John Gaddis (TAMUCC, Pitcher)
Gavin Stone (UCA, Pitcher)
Luke Taggart (UIW, Pitcher)
Jeremy Rodriguez (SFA, Pitcher)
Jake Dickerson (MCNS, Utility)

Roster

Schedule and results

{| class="toccolours" width=95% style="clear:both; margin:1.5em auto; text-align:center;"
|-
! colspan=2 style="" | 2021 Northwestern State Demons Baseball Game Log
|-
! colspan=2 style="" | Regular Season (27-24)
|- valign="top"
|

|-
|
{| class="wikitable collapsible " style="margin:auto; width:100%; text-align:center; font-size:95%"
! colspan=12 style="padding-left:4em;" | March (7-8)
|-
! Date
! Opponent
! Rank
! Site/Stadium
! Score
! Win
! Loss
! Save
! TV
! Attendance
! Overall Record
! SLC Record
|- align="center" bgcolor=#ddffdd
|Mar. 5 ||  || || H. Alvin Brown–C. C. Stroud Field • Natchitoches, LA || W 10-8 || Ohnoutka (1-0) || O'Shoney (0-1) || None || || 285 || 4-4 ||
|- align="center" bgcolor=#ddffdd
|Mar. 6 || Austin Peay || || H. Alvin Brown–C. C. Stroud Field • Natchitoches, LA || 'W 4-0 || Carver (2-0) || Jula (0-3) || None || || 478 || 5-4 ||
|- align="center" bgcolor=#ffdddd
|Mar. 7 || Austin Peay || || H. Alvin Brown–C. C. Stroud Field • Natchitoches, LA || L 2-3 || Martinez (1-1) || Brown (1-1) || Leob (1) || || 470 || 5-5 ||
|- align="center" bgcolor=#ddffdd
|Mar. 12 || Incarnate Word || || H. Alvin Brown–C. C. Stroud Field • Natchitoches, LA || W 5-4 || Harmon (1-2) || Rollins (1-1) || Makarewich (1) || || 463 || 6-5 || 1-0
|- align="center" bgcolor=#ffdddd
|Mar. 13 || Incarnate Word || || H. Alvin Brown–C. C. Stroud Field • Natchitoches, LA || L 1-2 || Zavala (2-0) || Carver (2-1) || None || || 305 || 6-6 || 1-1
|- align="center" bgcolor=#ffdddd
|Mar. 13 || Incarnate Word || || H. Alvin Brown–C. C. Stroud Field • Natchitoches, LA || L 2-3 || Foral (1-0) || Michel (0-1) || None || || 305 || 6-7 || 1-2
|- align="center" bgcolor=#ddffdd
|Mar. 14 || Incarnate Word || || H. Alvin Brown–C. C. Stroud Field • Natchitoches, LA || W 6-5 || Daigle (1-0) || Hayward (0-3) || None || || 427 || 7-7 || 2-2
|- align="center" bgcolor=#ffdddd
|Mar. 19 || at Sam Houston State || || Don Sanders Stadium • Huntsville, TX || L 2-3 || Lusk (1-1) || Makarewich (1-1) || None || || 412 || 7-8 || 2-3
|- align="center" bgcolor=#ddffdd
|Mar. 20 || at Sam Houston State || || Don Sanders Stadium • Huntsville, TX || W 3-1 || Carver (3-1) || Egli (0-1) || None || || 412 || 8-8 || 3-3
|- align="center" bgcolor=#ddffdd
|Mar. 20 || at Sam Houston State || || Don Sanders Stadium • Huntsville, TX || W 3-2 || David (1-1) || Robinson (0-1) || Ohnoutka (1) || || 412 || 9-8 || 4-3
|- align="center" bgcolor=#ffdddd
|Mar. 21 || at Sam Houston State || || Don Sanders Stadium • Huntsville, TX || L 3-6 || Atkinson (1-1) || Michel (0-2) || Lusk (1) || || 412 || 9-9 || 4-4
|- align="center" bgcolor=#ffdddd
|Mar. 26 || South Alabama || || H. Alvin Brown–C. C. Stroud Field • Natchitoches, LA || L 6-8 || Smith (2-0) || Makarewich (1-2) || None || || 491 || 9-10 ||
|- align="center" bgcolor=#ffdddd
|Mar. 27 || South Alabama || || H. Alvin Brown–C. C. Stroud Field • Natchitoches, LA || L 5-6 || Dalton (4-2) || David (1-2) || Samaniego (4) || || 434 || 9-11 ||
|- align="center" bgcolor=#ffdddd
|Mar. 28 || South Alabama || || H. Alvin Brown–C. C. Stroud Field • Natchitoches, LA || L 1-12 || Booker (2-0) || Graham (0-1) || None || || 520 || 9-12 ||
|- align="center" bgcolor=#ddffdd
|Mar. 30 ||  || || H. Alvin Brown–C. C. Stroud Field • Natchitoches, LA || W 7-3 || Millsap (1-0) || Noel (0-1) || None'' || || 402 || 10-12 || 
|}
|-
|

|-
|

|-
! colspan=2 style="" | Post-Season (0–2)
|-
|Schedule Source:*Rankings are based on the team's current ranking in the D1Baseball poll.
|}

Posteason
Conference Accolades 
Player of the Year: Colton Cowser – SHSU
Hitter of the Year: Colton Eager – ACU
Pitcher of the Year: Will Dion – MCNS
Relief Pitcher of the Year: Tyler Cleveland – UCA
Freshman of the Year: Brennan Stuprich – SELA
Newcomer of the Year: Grayson Tatrow – ACU
Clay Gould Coach of the Year: Rick McCarty – ACUAll Conference First TeamChase Kemp (LAMR)
Nate Fisbeck (MCNS)
Itchy Burts (TAMUCC)
Bash Randle (ACU)
Mitchell Dickson (ACU)
Lee Thomas (UIW)
Colton Cowser (SHSU)
Colton Eager (ACU)
Clayton Rasbeary (MCNS)
Will Dion (MCNS)
Brennan Stuprich (SELA)
Will Warren (SELA)
Tyler Cleveland (UCA)
Anthony Quirion (LAMR)All Conference Second TeamPreston Faulkner (SELA)Daunte Stuart (NSU)Kasten Furr (UNO)
Evan Keller (SELA)
Skylar Black (SFA)
Tre Obregon III (MCNS)
Jack Rogers (SHSU)
Pearce Howard (UNO)
Grayson Tatrow (ACU)
Chris Turpin (UNO)
John Gaddis (TAMUCC)
Trevin Michael (LAMR)
Caleb Seroski (UNO)
Jacob Burke (SELA)All Conference Third TeamLuke Marbach (TAMUCC)
Salo Iza (UNO)
Austin Cain (NICH)
Darren Willis (UNO)
Ryan Snell (LAMR)
Tommy Cruz (ACU)
Tyler Finke (SELA)
Payton Harden (MCNS)
Mike Williams (TAMUCC)Cal Carver (NSU)Levi David (NSU)Dominic Robinson (SHSU)
Jack Dallas (LAMR)
Brett Hammit (ACU)All Conference Defensive TeamLuke Marbach (TAMUCC)
Nate Fisebeck (MCNS)
Anthony Quirion (LAMR)
Darren Willis (UNO)
Gaby Cruz (SELA)
Julian Gonzales (MCNS)
Colton Cowser (SHSU)
Avery George (LAMR)
Will Dion (MCNS)References:'''

References

Northwestern State
Northwestern State Demons baseball seasons
Northwestern State Demons baseball